Tra or TRA may refer to:

Biology
 TRA (gene), in humans encodes the protein T-cell receptor alpha locus
 Tra (gene), in Drosophila melanogaster encodes the protein female-specific protein transformer
 Tra gene, a transfer gene 
 Triple releasing agent or serotonin-norepinephrine-dopamine releasing agent

Organizations
 Taiwan Railways Administration, the main railway system in Taiwan
 Tanzania Revenue Authority
 Telecommunications Regulatory Authority of Lebanon
 Telecommunications Regulatory Authority (UAE)
 Tennessee Regulatory Authority, for public utilities
 Theodore Roosevelt Association
 TRA, Inc., US ad measurement company
 Trinity River Authority, Texas, US
 Tripoli Rocketry Association, US

People
 Tra Hoa Bo Dê, King of Champa (in what is now southern Vietnam) 1342−1360
 Phạm Văn Trà (born 1935), Vietnamese general
 Trần Văn Trà (1918–1996), North Vietnamese general
 William Tra Thomas (born 1974), former US footballer

Other
 tRA (baseball statistic)
 Taiwan Relations Act of the US, 1979
 Tarama Airport, IATA code
 Theory of reasoned action, a model of persuasion
 Threat and risk assessment
 Tirahi language of Afghanistan, ISO 639-3 code
 Constellation Triangulum Australe
 Transport Research Arena, European conference
 Trans Rights Activist
 "Tra", a song by Bad Gyal from her 2018 album Worldwide Angel
 "Tra", a song by Soto Asa featuring Bad Gyal